Aminu Aliyu Shariff  also known as Aminu Momoh (born 17 February 1977) is a Nigerian filmmaker, director, story writer, TV personality, and magazine editor.

Filmography 
Aminu Shariff's filmography

Awards
List of awards received by Aminu Aliyu Shariff.

See also
 List of Nigerian actors
 List of Nigerian film directors

References

1977 births
Nigerian male film actors
Hausa-language mass media
Living people
Male actors in Hausa cinema
21st-century Nigerian male actors
Nigerian male television actors
Nigerian film award winners
Nigerian film directors
Nigerian television personalities
Nigerian television presenters
Nigerian editors
Kannywood actors
Nigerian media personalities